South Pass may refer to several places:

South Pass (Canada), a Rocky Mountain pass on the continental divide
South Pass (Louisiana), a channel of the Mississippi River in Plaquemines Parish, Louisiana, United States
South Pass (Wyoming), two mountain passes on the Continental Divide, in the Rocky Mountains of southwestern Wyoming
South Pass City, Wyoming, Fremont County, Wyoming

See also
 
 South Passage (disambiguation)